For information on all Haverford College sports, see Haverford Fords

The Haverford Fords men's soccer team is a varsity intercollegiate athletic team of Haverford College in Haverford, Pennsylvania, United States. The team is a member of the Centennial Conference, which is part of the National Collegiate Athletic Association's Division III. Haverford's first men's soccer team was fielded in 1901. The team plays its home games at Walton Field on the Haverford campus. The Fords are coached by Zach Ward.

The Fords have the distinction of winning the first three Intercollegiate Soccer Football Association national championships, the unofficial national championship that served as the predecessor to the NCAA Division I men's soccer tournament from 1905 until 1958. The 1904–05 team is considered by some to be the first organized collegiate national championship to be won by a program. The team would continue their early 20th century success before winning the ISFA titles in 1906, 1907, 1911 and 1918. In 1924, the program won the Pennsylvania Intercollegiate Association Football League season.

Roster 
As of October 15, 2020. Players whose numbers are listed "N/A" have not yet been assigned a number as a result of COVID-19.

Coaching history 

Haverford has had 19 men's soccer coaches in their program's history. The most recent head coach was Zach Ward, the men's soccer coach from 2018 until February, 2023.

See also 
Pre-regulation national championship team seasons
1901–02 Haverford Fords men's soccer team
National Championship team seasons
1904–05 Haverford Fords men's soccer team
1905–06 Haverford Fords men's soccer team
1906–07 Haverford Fords men's soccer team
1907–08 Haverford Fords men's soccer team
1910–11 Haverford Fords men's soccer team
 1917–18 Haverford Fords men's soccer team
 1926 Haverford Fords men's soccer team
 1945 Haverford Fords men's soccer team

References 

 
1901 establishments in Pennsylvania
Association football clubs established in 1901